The Lordship of Frisia or Lordship of Friesland was a feudal dominion in the Netherlands. It was formed in 1498 by Maximilian of Habsburg and reformed in 1524 when Emperor Charles V conquered Frisia.

History

The former Frisian kingdom (Magna Frisia) had been incorporated into Francia after the Frisian–Frankish wars, that ended with the victory of the Frankish troops led by majordomo Charles Martel at the Battle of the Boarn in 734. The remaining territory east of the Lauwers River was conquered by Charlemagne in the course of the Saxon Wars until 785.

During the decline of the Carolingian Empire in the 9th century, the Frisian coast with the important trading place of Dorestad was strongly affected by Viking raids. In turn the Frankish emperor Louis the Pious and his successor Lothair I, ruler of Middle Francia since 843, tried to pacify the Viking leaders such as Harald Klak or Rorik of Dorestad by vesting them with large estates in the Frisian lands. By the 870 Treaty of Meerssen, the Frisian lands passed to the Kingdom of East Francia under Louis the German, while the robberies continued. In 873 the Viking leader Rodulf Haraldsson was killed by the inhabitants of Eastergoa and from 879 Harald Klak's son Godfrid plundered the coast down to Flanders until he finally came to terms with Emperor Charles the Fat upon the 882 Siege of Asselt and was appointed a "Duke of Frisia".

Frisian freedom
However, the raids still did not stop and moreover Godfrid entangled in a rebellion with his brother-in-law, the Lotharingian duke Hugh of Alsace. He was killed in 885 by the emperor's vassal Henry of Franconia, aided by the local count Gerolf, who in turn was vested with large estates on the southern Frisian coast, that later emerged as the County of Holland. The Viking rule in Frisia was terminated, nevertheless in view of the continuous threat, the local peasants were granted the Frisian freedom (West Frisian: Fryske frijheid), which excluded them from the feudal customs in the Frankish Empire, with no suzerain above them than the Emperor himself. The Frisian representatives met in the Upstalsboom thing near present-day Aurich in East Frisia under the motto Eala Frya Fresena ("Stand up, free Frisians") to pass resolutions and to dispense justice.

In 925 the Frisian lands together with Lotharingia were finally incorporated into East Francia by King Henry the Fowler and became a part of the Holy Roman Empire from 962 onwards. The Viking raids continued until the early 11th century. By 1068, the Brunonen margrave Egbert I of Meissen had acquired several Frisian counties, his son an successor Margrave Egbert II, however, was involved in the Great Saxon Revolt against Emperor Henry IV and killed in 1090. The Emperor granted his estates to the loyal Bishop Conrad of Utrecht. The bishop was killed by a Frisian merchant in 1099, and the Brunonen heir, the Saxon count Henry of Northeim installed himself as a "margrave" of Frisia, before he himself was ambushed and killed two years later. The Utrecht Bishops asserted themselves in the city of Groningen, apart from that the Frisians had maintained their privileges against all attempts to subdue them.

About 1300 the "Seven Frisian Seelands" stretched along the coast from Westergo on the Zuiderzee to the border with Land Hadeln on the right shore of the Weser mouth, then a possession of the Ascanian dukes of Saxe-Lauenburg. In 1282 Count Floris V of Holland invaded West Frisia, several attempts by his successors to gain control over the Frisian lands were rejected in the Friso-Hollandic Wars, culminating in the 1345 Battle of Warns, whereby Count William IV of Holland was killed. His county together with Hainaut was inherited by the Bavarian House of Wittelsbach, and the Bavaria-Straubing duke Albert I again made several incursions into Frisia, nevertheless, the Hollandic threat faded as the Wittelsbach counts were more and more stuck in the internal Hook and Cod wars from 1350 onwards.

However, at the same time Frisia itself was war-torn by the long-lasting conflict between Vetkopers and Schieringers. Moreover, especially in East Frisia the actual power shifted gradually from the original cooperative towards several chieftain dynasties. In 1464 the Habsburg emperor Frederick III elevated the mighty chief Ulrich and his descendants of the Cirksena dynasty to heritable Counts of East Frisia, an Imperial State they held until 1744.

Feudal lordship
Finally in 1498, Frederick's son King Maximilian I ended the freedom in the remaining Frisian lands, when he appointed the Wettin duke Albert III of Saxony his stadtholder in Frisia for a loan of 300,000 guilders. Duke Albert had been a loyal follower of the Habsburgs in their struggle around the Burgundian heritage and had freed the King from custody at Brügge ten years before. However, the Saxon duke had to face strong resistance by the inhabitants, who in 1505 even laid siege to his son Henry at Franeker, while he himself attended the Saxon Landtag assembly in Leipzig.

Frisia was a possession of Albert's son Duke George of Saxony, but he also failed to subdue Frisia during the Guelders Wars. Frisia was largely controlled by local rebels, supported by troops of Duke Charles II of Guelders, who had been at war with Burgundy and Saxony for several years. In 1515, George sold his title to Frisia to Charles (then Duke of Burgundy), and heir of the House of Habsburg). However, by the purchase Charles gained control of only a few cities: Leeuwarden, Harlingen, and Franeker.

In 1519, Charles succeeded to his full inheritance. In 1522, he sent a Habsburg army under Georg Schenck van Toutenburg to subdue the rebellious parts of the Netherlands. In 1523, Van Toutenburg drove the Guelders forces out of Frisia. Van Toutenburg also defeated the Frisians rebels under Wijerd Jelckama, who was publicly beheaded in Leeuwarden. Frisia was now firmly in the hands of Charles and incorporated into the Seventeen Provinces of the Habsburg Netherlands. Van Toutenburg became Stadtholder and ruled the province for him.

When Charles abdicated in 1556, Frisia was inherited by Philip II of Spain with the rest of the Netherlands. In 1566, Frisia joined the rebellion against Spanish rule.

In 1577, George van Lalaing (Count Rennenburg) was appointed Stadtholder of Frisia and other provinces. A moderate, trusted by both sides, he tried to reconcile the rebels with the Crown. But in 1580, Rennenburg declared for Spain. The States of Friesland raised troops and took his strongholds of Leeuwarden, Harlingen and Stavoren.

Rennenburg was deposed and Frisia became the fifth Lordship to join the rebels' Union of Utrecht. From 1580 onwards, all stadtholders were members of the House of Nassau-Dietz, not of the House of Orange, like the stadtholders of Holland.

When the Batavian Republic was created in 1795, the Lordship of Frisia was abolished as a relic of the Ancien Régime.

Cities
The ancient cities of Friesland are shown below:

Stadtholders of Friesland
 Floris van Egmond, Count of Buren, 1515–1518
 Willem van Roggendorff, 1518–1521
 Jancko Douwama, 1522 (Frisian rebel)
 Georg Schenck van Toutenburg, 1521–1540
 Maximiliaan van Egmond, Count of Buren, 1540–1548
 Jean de Ligne, Count of Arenberg, 1559–1568
 Charles de Brimeu, Count of Megen, 1568–1572
 Gillis van Berlaymont, Lord of Hierges, 1572–1574
 Caspar de Robles, 1574–1576 (according to some sources 1572–1576)
 George van Lalaing, Count Rennenberg, 1576–1581 (deposed in 1580)

For Spain:
 Francisco Verdugo, 1581–1594 (claimant)

For the States of Friesland:
 William of Orange, 1580–1584
 Willem Lodewijk, 1584–1620
 Ernst Casimir, 1620–1632
 Hendrik Casimir I, 1632–1640
 Willem Frederik, 1640–1664
 Hendrik Casimir II, 1664–1696
 Johan Willem Friso of Orange-Nassau, 1696–1711
 William IV, Prince of Orange, 1711–1751 (became stadtholder for the other Dutch provinces in 1747)
William V, Prince of Orange, 1751–1795

History of Friesland
Frisia
1524 establishments in the Holy Roman Empire